Testa  may refer to:

 Testa (botany), a term to describe the seed coat
 Testa (surname)
 Testa, Hurwitz & Thibeault, a former Boston law firm
 11667 Testa, a main-belt asteroid discovered in 1997
 Testa (ceramics), fired clay material, especially crushed brick used in mortar
 Trans European Services for Telematics between Administrations
 Trebatius Testa (fl. 1st century BC), jurist of ancient Rome
 Tesch & Stabenow, a German chemical company notable for its role in the Holocaust

See also
 Head (disambiguation), testa being the Italian word for head
 Testarossa (disambiguation)